William J. Kennedy may refer to:

William Kennedy (author)
William Kennedy (Montana politician)

See also
William Kennedy (disambiguation)